The 16th constituency of Budapest is one of the single member constituencies of the National Assembly, the national legislature of Hungary. The constituency standard abbreviation: Budapest 16. OEVK.

Since 2014, it has been represented by István Hiller of the MSZP-Dialogue party alliance.

Geography
The 16th constituency is located in southern part of Pest.

List of districts
The constituency includes the following municipalities:

 District XX.: Full part of the district.
 District XIX.: Southwestern part of the district (west of the Ady Endre út).

Members
The constituency was first represented by István Hiller of MSZP (with Unity support) from 2014, and he was re-elected in 2018.

Notes

References

Budapest 16th